Carl L. Linde (May 21, 1864 – July 12, 1945) was an American architect based in the Pacific Northwest of the United States, particularly in Portland, Oregon. Several of his works are listed on the National Register of Historic Places.

Biography
Linde was born in Brunswick, Germany, and moved with his family to Milwaukee. He worked with O. C. Uehling and in Chicago before he moved to Portland, Oregon in 1906. He worked there as an architect until 1940. He started his own practice after 1921, and prior to that he worked for established Portland architects. Throughout his career, he became known for his preference toward Jacobean Revival architecture. Linde died in Portland on July 12, 1945.

Works
 Ambassador Apartments, 1209 SW 6th Avenue, Portland, Oregon, NRHP-listed
 Camlin Hotel, 1619 Ninth Street, Seattle, Washington, NRHP-listed
 Clovelly Garden Apartments, 6309 NE Union Avenue, Portland, Oregon, NRHP-listed
 Digman-Zidell House, 2959 SW Bennington Drive, Portland, Oregon, NRHP-listed
 Electric Building, 621 SW Alder Street, Portland, Oregon, NRHP-listed 
 Embassy Apartments (built 1925), 2015 NW Flanders Street, Portland, Oregon, a contributing property in the NRHP-listed Alphabet Historic District
 Envoy Apartment Building, 2336 SW Osage, Portland, Oregon, NRHP-listed
 Otho Poole House, 506 NW Hermosa Blvd., Portland, Oregon, NRHP-listed
 Salerno Apartments, 2325 NE Flanders Street, Portland, Oregon, NRHP-listed
 Sorrento Court Apartments, 2250 NE Flanders Street, Portland, Oregon
 Shemanski Fountain, South Park Blocks, Portland, Oregon
 Sovereign Hotel, 710 SW Madison Street, Portland, Oregon, NRHP-listed
 Tudor Arms Apartments, 1811 NW Couch Street, Portland, Oregon, NRHP-listed
 View Point Inn, 40301 NE Larch Mountain Road, Corbett, Oregon, NRHP-listed

References

1864 births
1945 deaths
20th-century American architects
Architects from Portland, Oregon
20th-century German architects
German emigrants to the United States